William Harris (born 1 October 2000) is an English professional footballer who plays for National League club Gateshead.

Professional career
A youth product of Hebburn Town and Burnley, Harris began his career with consecutive loans to Colne and Warrington Town. He moved to Sunderland on 1 September 2020. He made his professional debut with Sunderland in a 2–1 EFL Trophy win over Lincoln City on 5 October 2021. He made his senior professional league debut on 16 October 2021 coming on as a 90th minute substitute in a 2-1 win over Gillingham.

On 6 January 2022, Harris joined EFL League Two side Barrow on loan for the remainder of the 2021–22 season. Featuring 9 times for The Bluebirds. Before being released at the end of his contract with Sunderland.

On 29 July 2022, Harris signed for National League club Gateshead on a one-year deal.

References

External links
 

2000 births
Living people
Footballers from South Shields
English footballers
Association football forwards
Sunderland A.F.C. players
Warrington Town F.C. players
Colne F.C. players
Burnley F.C. players
Hebburn Town F.C. players
Barrow A.F.C. players
Gateshead F.C. players
English Football League players
Northern Premier League players